Brezni Vrh is a dispersed settlement in the hills north of the Drava River in the Municipality of Radlje ob Dravi in Slovenia, on the border with Austria.

References

External links
Brezni Vrh on Geopedia

Populated places in the Municipality of Radlje ob Dravi